Carlos Montero Castiñeira (born 9 October 1972) is a Spanish screenwriter, film producer, film director and television producer. Featuring an extensive background as writer of teen drama television series, he is the creator of Física o Química and Elite.

Biography 
Carlos Montero was born on 9 October 1972 in Celanova, Province of Ourense, Montero earned a licentiate degree in Information Sciences (Journalism) from the Complutense University of Madrid (UCM).

Career 
Starting at 25 years old, he wrote the screenplay of hundreds of episodes of the teen drama series Al salir de clase from 1997 to 1999. He was the creator of another popular teen drama series, Física o Química (2008–2011). He co-wrote together with Jaime Vaca the screenplay of the Daniel Calparsoro's film Combustión, released in 2013.

He also worked in other television series such as El tiempo entre costuras (The Time in Between), Apaches, and El comisario.

Working for Netflix, he created the teen drama series Élite together with Darío Madrona and created the Netflix series El desorden que dejas (The Mess You Leave Behind), an adaptation of his own novel, winner of the 2016 Premio Primavera de Novela. He partnered again with Madrona to write the screenplay of the 2019 film Gente que viene y bah (In Family I Trust), adapting the novel by Laura Norton. He co-created together with Agustín Martínez the Netflix fantasy thriller series Feria, which began filming in 2021.

Filmography

Movies

Television

Novels 
 2012: Los tatuajes no se borran con láser
 2016: The Mess You Leave Behind ( 2016)

References 

1972 births
People from the Province of Ourense
Writers from Galicia (Spain)
Spanish male screenwriters
Spanish LGBT screenwriters
Living people
21st-century Spanish LGBT people